William W. Marr (born  September 3, 1936) was born in Taiwan and grew up in a small village in Guangdong, China.He is a poet.He published his first book of english poems in 1995.

Engineering research career
Marr was educated in Taiwan and came to the United States in 1961 as an engineering student. After receiving his master's degree in mechanical engineering from Marquette University in 1963, he worked for Allis-Chalmers Mfg. Co. in Milwaukee, developing safety and control systems for nuclear power plants. He entered the University of Wisconsin–Madison in 1967 and received  his PhD degree in nuclear engineering two years later. In 1969, he joined Argonne National Laboratory as a researcher, working in the area of energy and environmental systems, including Liquid Metal Fast Breeder Reactor safety research,  and electric hybrid vehicle development.

Poet and translator
Marr has devoted most of his leisure time to the translation and writing of modern poetry.  He has published nineteen books of poems in his native Chinese language, all under the pen name Fei Ma , and several books of translations.   He published his first book of poems in English, Autumn Window, in 1995.   The book was very well received. The Chicago Tribune and several local newspapers carried favorable reviews and he was hailed by one of the Chicago critics as one of the collectible Chicago poets.   Regarded as one of the leading contemporary Chinese-language poets, his poems are included in over one hundred anthologies, ranging from literary textbooks to special collections and have been translated into more than ten languages.  He has also edited several anthologies of Chinese and Taiwanese modern poetry and has received several awards from Taiwan for his poetry translation and writing.  He is a former president of the Illinois State Poetry Society.

Artist
Since 1990, he has engaged in artistic activities such as painting and sculpting, and has held several solo and group art exhibitions in art galleries and public libraries in the Chicago area. In 2006, some of his paintings were displayed on PublicBoard.com, a Website devoted to art and literature, for the celebration of the Chinese New Year.   During the 2008 Olympics, he was invited to participate in an art show at an art museum in Beijing.

Publications 
 In the Windy City, Chinese/English, Li Poetry Society, Taipei, Taiwan, 1975
 Selected Poems of William Marr, Taiwan Commercial Press, Taipei, Taiwan, 1983
 The White Horce, Times Publishing Company, Taipei, Taiwan, 1984
 Anthology of Fei Ma's Poetry, Joint Publishing, Hong Kong, 1984
 The Resounding Echos of Hoof Beats, Li Poetry Society, Taipei, Taiwan, 1986
 Road, Elite Publishing Co., Taipei, Taiwan, 1986 
 Anthology of Short Poems by Fei Ma, Strait Art Publishing House, Fuzhou, China, 1990
 CHANSONS, translation of selected poems by Pai Chiu, Chinese/English, Giant Publishing Co., Taipei, 1972; Rock Publisher, Taipei, 1991
 Fly! Spirit, Morning Star Publishing Co., Taichung, Taiwan, 1992
 Anthology of Self-selected poems by Fei Ma, Guizhou People's Press, 1993
 Autumn Window, anthology of English poems, Arbor Hill Press, Chicago, 1995; 2nd Edition, 1996
 The Microscopic World, Taichung Cultural Center, Taichung, Taiwan, 1998
 Let the Feast Begin—My Favorite English Poems, English/Chinese, Bookman Publishing Co., Taipei, 1999
 The Poetic Art of Fei Ma, Writers Publishing House, Beijing, China, 1999
 Not All Flowers Need to Bear Fruits, Bookman Books Co., Taipei, Taiwan, 2000
 Poems of Fei Ma, Flower City Publishing House, Guangzhou, China, 2000
 Selected Poems of William Marr, The Milkyway Publishing Co., Hong Kong, 2003
 Selected Poems of William Marr, Chinese/English, The World Contemporary Poetry Series, The Milky Way Publishing Co., Hong Kong, 2003
 Anthology of Poems by Fei Ma, National Museum of Taiwan Literature, Tainan, Taiwan, 2009
 Between Heaven and Earth, selected poems in English, PublishAmerica, Baltimore, 2010
 You Are the Wind,  Anthology of Fei Ma's Poetry, Vol. 1 (1950-1979),  Showwe, Taipei, Taiwan, 2011
 Dream Design, Anthology of Fei Ma's Poetry, Vol. 2 (1980-1989),  Showwe, Taipei, Taiwan, 2011
 The World of Grasshoppers, Anthology of Fei Ma's Poetry, Vol. 3 (1990-1999), Showwe, Taipei, Taiwan, 2012
 The Sunshine Scarf, Anthology of Fei Ma's Poetry, Vol. 4 (2000-2012),  Showwe, Taipei, Taiwan, 2012
 Beyond Space and Time, Anthology of Fei Ma's Poetry, Vol. 5 (2013-2021), Showwe, Taipei, Taiwan, 2022
 CHANSONS POUR TOI ET MOI, Chinese/French, (French translator: Athanase Vantchev de Thracy), The Cultural Institute of Solenza, Paris, 2014
 Chicago Serenade, Chinese/English/French, (French translator: Athanase Vantchev de Thracy), The Cultural Institute of Solenza, Paris, 2015
 SONGS OF MY OWN, translation of Poems by Li Qing-Song, Chinese/English, Writers Publishing House, Beijing, 2015
 SUMMER SONGS, English translation of poems by Lin Ming-Li, Chinese/English/French, The Cultural Institute of Solenza, Paris, 2015
 Listen, English translation of poems by Lin Ming-Li, The Liberal Arts Press, Taipei, 2018
 Cézanne's Still Life and Other Poems, English/Italian, (Italian translator: Giovanni Campisi),Edizioni Universum, Trento, Italy, 2018
 Portrait and Other Poems, English/Italian, (Italian translator: Giovanni Campisi),  Edizioni Universum, Trento, Italy, 2019
 Selected Chinese/English Poems of William Marr, The Earth Culture Press, China, 2021
 BEYOND ALL COLORS, Poems by Xiaohong, Paintings by William Marr, translations by Denis Mair, I WING PRESS, 2021
 A DREAMLESS NIGHT, the Selected Chinese/English Poems of William Marr, Chicago Academic Press, 2021
 EVERY DAY A BLUE SKY, Humorous and Satirical Poetry of William Marr, Washington Writers Press, 2021
 THE HOMESICK DRUNK, selected poems of William Marr, Korean translations by Hong Junzhi/Jiang Meihua, New Century Press, 2021
 Penetrating Time and Space, A Poetry Group of William Marr, ed. by Bing Hua & Xiaohong, Washington Writers Press, Jan. 2022

References
International Who's Who in Poetry 1974-75 (Fourth Edition, Ernest Kay Editor, Cambridge and London, England), 1974; 2003; 2005
The Isle Full of Noises, Ed. Dominic Cheung, Columbia University Press, New York, 1987
The Voice of the Poet, Chicago Tribune (Tempo Dupage), 1996.2.25
The Nuclear Poet, Downers Grove Reporter, 1996.4.19
Going 60 in Chicago—60 Years of Poetry from The Poets Club of Chicago,.
International Who's Who in Poetry and Poets' Encyclopaedia, 9th Edition.; 2003
International Authors and Writers Who's Who—16th Edition,1999; 17th Edition, 2001;2003;2005

External links
An Interview with William Marr, by Alan Harris, http://www.poetrysky.com/interview.html
William Marr: Five Poems, published in Eastlit, August 2013, http://www.eastlit.com/eastlit-august-2013/eastlit-august-2013-content/william-marr-five-poems/
William Marr: Five Poems, published in Eastlit, February 2014, http://www.eastlit.com/eastlit-february-2014/eastlit-february-2014-content/william-marr-poetry/
Poetry Hall First Poet Laureate William Marr，https://poetryh.com/Personages/Personages-William%20Marr%20001.htm

American male poets
Taiwanese emigrants to the United States
Living people
Marquette University alumni
University of Wisconsin–Madison College of Engineering alumni
American poets
American writers of Chinese descent
Taiwanese poets
20th-century Chinese translators
21st-century Chinese translators
Chinese science writers
American mechanical engineers
American science writers
Writers from Taichung
Allis-Chalmers Manufacturing Company
Republic of China poets
1936 births
American male non-fiction writers